Manuel "Manny" Aparicio (born September 17, 1995) is a Canadian professional soccer player who plays as a midfielder for Pacific FC.

Club career

Toronto FC
Aparicio signed his first professional contract in 2013 at the age of 17 years old, becoming the eighth TFC Academy graduate to the professional team. He appeared in two midseason friendlies for Toronto FC in 2015, against English Premier League teams Manchester City and Sunderland.

Loan to Wilmington
He was loaned out in early 2014 to USL PRO side Wilmington Hammerheads after the two clubs formed a partnership. He was loaned alongside Quillan Roberts and Daniel Lovitz. Aparicio made his debut for Wilmington in the season opener on April 5, 2014, against the Harrisburg City Islanders.

Loan to Toronto FC II
Aparicio was loaned to Toronto FC II on March 20, 2015.  He made his debut against the Charleston Battery on March 21.

Toronto FC announced on December 1, 2015 that Aparicio would not be returning to the team for the 2016 MLS Season.

Órdenes
On August 15, 2016 Aparicio signed with SD Órdenes on a one-year deal, making 30 league appearances and scoring four goals.

Izarra
In summer 2017, Aparicio signed with Spanish Segunda División B club CD Izarra and made 20 league appearances that season.

San Roque
In summer 2018, Aparicio signed with Spanish Tercera División club CD San Roque de Lepe and made 11 appearances, scoring one goal.

York9
On January 14, 2019, Aparicio signed with Canadian Premier League club York9. The 2019 season was the first in both Canadian Premier League and York9 FC history, and before it started Aparicio was named the first-ever captain for York9. Aparicio took part in the Canadian Premier League's first game in history, a 1–1 draw in Hamilton, Ontario against Forge FC and assisted the first ever Canadian Premier League goal in the third minute of the match. However he also became the first player to be red carded in the Canadian Premier League, after receiving a second caution for a deliberate handball in second-half stoppage time.

Pacific FC
On 6 November 2020, Aparicio signed with Pacific FC.

International career

Youth 
Aparicio has represented Canada at youth level. He received his first senior team experience when Canada coach Benito Floro included him in a camp the team had in Sunrise, Florida in January 2014. He was later a part of the U-20 squad that participated in the 2014 Milk Cup. He represented Canada during the Pan American games in 2015. In May 2016, Aparicio was called to Canada's U23 national team for a pair of friendlies against Guyana and Grenada. He saw action in both matches.

Senior 
Aparicio was recalled to the senior team for a friendly against Colombia in October 2014, where he made his debut for the national team.

Honours

Club
Pacific FC
Canadian Premier League: 2021

Career statistics

Club

International

References

External links

TFC player profile
SD Órdenes

1995 births
Living people
Association football midfielders
Canadian soccer players
Footballers from Buenos Aires
Soccer players from Toronto
Argentine emigrants to Canada
Naturalized citizens of Canada
Canadian expatriate soccer players
Expatriate soccer players in the United States
Canadian expatriate sportspeople in the United States
Expatriate footballers in Spain
Canadian expatriate sportspeople in Spain
Toronto FC players
Wilmington Hammerheads FC players
Toronto FC II players
CD Izarra footballers
CD San Roque de Lepe footballers
York United FC players
Pacific FC players
Canadian Soccer League (1998–present) players
Major League Soccer players
USL Championship players
Tercera División players
Segunda División B players
Canadian Premier League players
Canada men's youth international soccer players
Canada men's international soccer players
2015 CONCACAF U-20 Championship players
Footballers at the 2015 Pan American Games
Homegrown Players (MLS)
Pan American Games competitors for Canada
Unionville Milliken SC players